"Wish" is a song by American DJ Diplo featuring American rapper Trippie Redd. It was released on March 23, 2018, as a single from Diplo's EP California (2018) and Redd's debut studio album Life's a Trip (2018).

Composition
Trevor Smith of HotNewHipHop described the style of the song as almost "bright and fast enough" to be pop radio-friendly, even though it has a dark subject matter. The song also features a "dreamy melody" from Diplo.

Music video
The official music video was released on April 25, 2018. It opens with Diplo and Trippie Redd posing on the balcony of a lavish mansion, before Redd goes inside and plays with a group of baby goats. He wanders inside the mansion, as he experiences psychedelic effects. Eventually, Redd swings from a chandelier surrounded by fireworks, as an escape from the goats.

An alternate music video was released in February 2020. This visual takes place in a warehouse and starts off with Trippie Redd seemingly killing clones of himself, through the use of visual effects, until a stand-in actor kills him by mistake. The video crew panics and attempts to call an ambulance, but the director suggests to "keep rolling", instead wrapping Redd's body with a trash bag and throwing it over a bridge.

Charts

Certifications

References

2018 singles
2018 songs
Diplo songs
Trippie Redd songs
Song recordings produced by Diplo
Songs written by Diplo
Songs written by Trippie Redd
Songs written by Boaz van de Beatz